EastWest Studios (formerly known as Western Studio, a component of United Western Recorders and later Ocean Way Recording) is a recording studio complex located at 6000 West Sunset Boulevard in Hollywood. Originally constructed by Bill Putnam in the 1960s, the studios are currently owned by sound developer Doug Rogers and managed by Candace Stewart.

Background

EastWest Studios was first known as Western Studio, one half of the United Western Recorders studio complex located on 6000 and 6050 West Sunset Boulevard. In 1984, United Western Recorders was sold and renamed to Ocean Way Recording. In 1998, the former Western Studio half at 6000 Sunset was divided from Ocean Way Recording, sold, and renamed to Cello Studios. In 2005, Cello Studios ceased operation. 

On January 17, 2006, Doug Rogers acquired ownership of 6000 Sunset. Rogers commissioned designer Philippe Starck (SLS Hotel Los Angeles, St. Martins Lane hotel, London) to refurbish and redesign the artist lounges, kitchen, and reception areas, which had previously suffered water damage. Careful to preserve the integrity of the original recording facilities, Starck and Rogers implemented a brand-new design to create "a place where artists can meet, mingle, and be inspired".  The studio complex became Starck's first and only recording studio design.

In March 2009, the renovated studios, renamed EastWest Studios, opened to the public. Since then, its clients have received over 120 Grammy nominations from recordings made in EastWest Studios, more than any other studio in the world.

Live rooms and consoles 
EastWest Studios consists of three main studios. Studio 2's live room measures , with a  isolation booth and  vocal booth and a classic RCA custom Neve 8028 console. All three rooms are fitted with flying fader automation and ATC main monitors.

Virtual instruments 
EastWest Sounds virtual instruments are recorded in EastWest Studios.

One of the company's many endeavors was their Hollywood Orchestra virtual instrument, recorded at Studio 1 with some of Hollywood's film score orchestral session players and sound engineer Shawn Murphy. The Hollywood Orchestral series is, according to EastWest's webpage, one of the most detailed orchestral virtual instruments in the world. Another of the company's most successful products is their Symphonic Orchestra, a 24-bit orchestral virtual instrument. The virtual instrument was conceived by producers Doug Rogers (head of EastWest Sounds) and Nick Phoenix (co-founder of Two Steps From Hell) and recorded by Grammy-winning recording engineer Professor Keith O Johnson. Recording took place in a 2200-seater concert hall, starting in August 2002. The resulting multi-channel recordings would later be edited and programmed for another year. Four editions of the library have been released: Silver, Gold, Platinum and Platinum Plus. Complementary to their symphonic virtual instruments, they released various, orchestral solo instruments (such as solo violin, solo cello and solo harp) and two choir virtual instruments "Symphonic Choirs" and the 2019 NAMM TEC Award winner "Hollywood Choirs".

Apart from their symphonic virtual instruments, they also released over sixty other collections, each of them specialized in a certain genre. All of these collections are available in EastWest's ComposerCloud subscription.

References 

Recording studios in California
 01
Buildings and structures in Hollywood, Los Angeles
Sunset Boulevard (Los Angeles)
Music of Los Angeles
Companies based in Los Angeles
Entertainment companies based in California
Entertainment companies established in 2006
Mass media companies established in 2006
2006 establishments in California